Michael Herzog (Hebrew: מיכאל (מייק) הרצוג, born July 15, 1952) is an Israeli diplomat and retired military officer who was appointed the Israeli ambassador to the United States in November 2021.

Biography
Michael (Mike) Herzog is the son of Chaim Herzog, the sixth President of Israel.  Herzog's mother is Aura Herzog. His paternal grandfather was Yitzhak HaLevi Herzog, the chief rabbi of both Ireland and Israel. His uncle, Yaakov Herzog, served as Israel's ambassador to Canada. His younger brother, Isaac Herzog, is the eleventh President of Israel.

Herzog is married to Shirin Herzog (née Halperin), an attorney, with whom he has two children.

Military career
Herzog served as a general in the Israel Defense Forces. He was the military secretary for both Shaul Mofaz and Ehud Barak when they served as defense ministers.

Diplomatic career
Before his appointment as ambassador, he was Permanent Representative of Israel to the United Nations. In 2021, he was appointed by Prime Minister of Israel Naftali Bennett, replacing Gilad Erdan, who continues to serve as ambassador to the UN. A researcher in the field of Israeli-Middle East relations, he has been a fellow at the Washington Institute for Near East Policy think tank and participated in the 2013-2014 peace negotiations between Israel and the Palestinians.

References

1952 births
Living people
Israeli people of the Yom Kippur War
Herzog family
People of the Military Intelligence Directorate (Israel)
Israeli people of Egyptian-Jewish descent
Israeli people of Irish-Jewish descent
Israeli people of Lithuanian-Jewish descent
Israeli people of Polish-Jewish descent
Israeli people of Russian-Jewish descent